The Shuitou Pier is a pier in Jincheng Township, Kinmen County, Fujian Province, Republic of China.

History
The pier area was originally a fishing harbor. On 30 October 2008, an inauguration ceremony was held at the pier to mark the installation of fire hydrant system using seawater to extinguish fire. The ceremony was attended by Kinmen County Magistrate Lee Chu-feng. The fire fighting system was installed by the Fire Bureau of Kinmen County Government.

Routes and operation
Ferries departing from the pier go to Jiugong Pier in Lieyu Island. It also departs to Dongdu Port and Wutong Port in Xiamen and Shijing Port in Quanzhou. It operates 42 boats per day.

Transportation
The pier is accessible by bus from Jincheng town center.

See also
 Three Links

References

Jincheng Township
Piers in Kinmen County